Gymnastics events have been staged at the Olympic Games since 1896, but women's events first appeared in 1928. American female gymnasts have participated in every Olympic Games since 1936, except for 1980. A total of 83 female gymnasts have represented the United States. American women have won 48 medals at the Olympics – 9 in team all-around, 8 in individual all-around, 4 in vault, 8 in uneven bars, 10 in balance beam, and 9 in floor exercise. The medals include 28 golds. The U.S. has medaled in the team all-around in every Summer Olympics since 1992, winning golds in 1996, 2012, and 2016.

Seven American female gymnasts have won at least four medals at the Olympic Games: Shannon Miller (seven), Simone Biles (seven), Aly Raisman (six), Nastia Liukin (five), Mary Lou Retton (five), Dominique Dawes (four), and Shawn Johnson (four).

In 1984, Mary Lou Retton became the first American female gymnast to win the individual all-around gold medal at the Olympics. She won five total medals that year in the only Olympic Games she participated in.

Shannon Miller, who competed at the 1992 and 1996 Olympics, won seven total Olympic medals, which was the most of any American female gymnast before the 2021 Olympics in which Simone Biles tied for the number of Olympic medals won. Miller won five medals in 1992 and added two more in 1996. Dominique Dawes competed at the 1992, 1996, and 2000 Olympics, winning four medals. Miller and Dawes were both members of the "Magnificent Seven", the 1996 team that became the first American squad to win the team all-around gold medal at the Olympics. The competition was highlighted by Kerri Strug sticking a vault while injured to ensure the U.S. victory.

Nastia Liukin and Shawn Johnson won five and four medals, respectively, in 2008, the only Olympics that either one participated in. Liukin won the individual all-around gold medal, and Johnson won the balance beam gold medal.

In 2012, the U.S. won the team all-around for the second time. This team, which was nicknamed the "Fierce Five", featured five gymnasts who were all making their first appearance at the Olympics. That year, Gabby Douglas won the gold medal in individual all-around, and Aly Raisman won the gold medal in floor exercise.

In 2016, the U.S. won the team all-around gold medal for the second consecutive Olympics, and the third title overall. The team was nicknamed "The Final Five" (as 2016 was the last year when five team members were allowed to participate) and featured the return of 2012 Olympic gold medalists Gabby Douglas and Aly Raisman. It also featured newcomers Laurie Hernandez, Madison Kocian, and three-time reigning world all-around champion Simone Biles. Biles won the individual all-around, vault, and floor exercise gold medals, and also took bronze in the balance beam final. Raisman won silver medals in the all-around and floor exercise. Hernandez took the silver on the balance beam while Kocian, the reigning uneven bars world co-champion would win silver in that event. The 2016 Olympics were the most successful games to date for the United States in women's gymnastics, with four golds, four silvers, and one bronze medal overall.

Gymnasts

Medalists

See also
 List of Olympic male artistic gymnasts for the United States

References

Olympic female gymnasts
United States
Artistic gymnasts